Pocho (feminine: pocha) is slang in Spanish used in Mexico to refer to Mexican Americans and Mexican emigrants. It is often used  pejoratively to describe a Mexican expatriate or a person of Mexican ancestry who lacks fluency or the ability to speak in Spanish and knowledge of Mexican culture. It derives from the Spanish word pocho, used to describe fruit that has become rotten or discolored.

The term can refer to the following:
 A Mexican American or expat who speaks broken or no Spanish.
 A Mexican American who speaks Anglicized Spanish, colloquially known as Spanglish.
 A Mexican that has emigrated from Mexico and settled or naturalized in another country.
 A Mexican that travels, works, or lives outside of Mexico for an extended period of time. e.g. Mexican students studying abroad.
 A Mexican that does not adhere to traditional Mexican culture, customs, and etiquette.
 A nickname in Argentina (Pocho or Pocha). For example, the popular Argentine president Juan Perón was called "El Pocho" as well as the Argentinian football players Ezequiel Lavezzi and Federico Insúa. 
 A 1959 Chicano novel by José Antonio Villarreal.

Pochos are usually identified by their use of non-standard Spanish. Code switching and the use of loanwords is common as is the use of phrases popular in American culture translated to Spanish, sometimes literally.  Code switching often involves inserting English preposition or objective nouns, such as, "Voy a ir shopping ahora en el supermarket" (I am going shopping now at the supermarket).

Modified loanwords are referred to as "pochismos". Examples include mopear for trapear (to mop), troque for camion (truck), parquear for estacionar (to park), or chequear for mirar or verificar (to check, to inspect or to verify). A clear example of a popular American phrase that has been adopted by people familiar with both cultures would be Clint Eastwood's famous quote "Make my day", which has been increasingly used in Spanish as "Hacer mi día."

See also

Pochano

References

External links

 Definition of pocho
 "A Note on 'Pochismo'" by William E. Wilson, The Modern Language Journal, Vol. 30, No. 6 (Oct. 1946), pp. 345–346 (Available online at JSTOR - membership required)

Mexican culture
Anti-Americanism
Chicano
Cultural assimilation
Mexican slang
Ethnic and religious slurs
Pejorative demonyms